Sukhdev Singh Libra, was an Indian politician and Member of Parliament.

Early life
He was born on 7th Nov., 1932 in a Ramdasia Sikh  Chamar  family to Sardar Kartar Singh and Chand Kaur at Libra village, Khanna, Punjab.

He did his schooling from Shri Guru Govind Singh High School, Khanna.

Politics
In 2004, he became member of the 14th Lok Sabha from Ropar Constituency.
In 1985 he became a member of the Legislative Assembly Punjab and Member of Rajya Sabha in 1998.
In 2008, he represented the Fatehgarh Sahib constituency.

He also served as chairman of Scheduled Castes Welfare Corporation (Punjab), member of Shiromani Gurudwara Prabandhak Committee (SGPC) and Board Gurdwara Sahib Sach Khand Shri Abchal Nagar Hazur Sahib Nanded, Maharashtra.

He died due to prolonged illness at his ancestral village in Khanna.

References

External links
 Members of Fourteenth Lok Sabha - Parliament of India website

1932 births
2019 deaths
India MPs 2009–2014
People from Fatehgarh Sahib
People from Ludhiana district
Punjabi people
Shiromani Akali Dal politicians
Lok Sabha members from Punjab, India
India MPs 2004–2009
Rajya Sabha members from Punjab, India
Indian National Congress politicians from Punjab, India
People from Rupnagar district
Politicians from Ludhiana